Weasel Hill is a small distinctive elevation in the ice piedmont 5 miles north of Larsen Inlet, Graham Land, between Pyke and Polaris Glaciers. Mapped from surveys by Falkland Islands Dependencies Survey (FIDS) (1960–61). Named by United Kingdom Antarctic Place-Names Committee (UK-APC). after the M-29 Tracked Cargo Carrier, or "Weasel," manufactured by the Studebaker Corporation.

Hills of Graham Land
Nordenskjöld Coast